Per incuriam, literally translated as "through lack of care" is a device within the common law system of judicial precedent. A finding of per incuriam means that a previous court judgment has failed to pay attention to relevant statutory provision or precedents.  

The significance of a judgment having been decided per incuriam is that it need not be followed by a lower court.  Ordinarily, the rationes of a judgment is binding upon lower courts in similar cases.  However, a lower court is free to depart from a decision of a superior court where that earlier judgment was decided per incuriam.

Examples of per incuriam
Examples of per incuriam are uncommon, partly because the device is perceived by upper courts as a type of lèse-majesté, and respectful lower courts prefer to  distinguish such precedent cases if possible.

The Court of Appeal in Morelle Ltd v Wakeling [1955] 2 QB 379 stated that as a general rule the only cases in which decisions should be held to have been given per incuriam are those of decisions given in ignorance or forgetfulness of some inconsistent statutory provision or of some authority binding on the court concerned: so that in such cases some part of the decision or some step in the reasoning on which it is based is found, on that account, to be demonstrably wrong. 

In R v Northumberland Compensation Appeal Tribunal ex parte Shaw [1951] 1 All ER 268, a divisional court of the King's Bench division declined to follow a Court of Appeal decision on the ground that the decision had been reached per incuriam for failure to cite a relevant House of Lords decision.

Some academic critics have suggested that Re Polemis was decided per incuriam as it did not rely upon the earlier decision in Hadley v Baxendale 1854.

Similarly, others have suggested that Foakes v Beer was decided per incuriam as it failed to note the recent House of Lords decision in Hughes v Metropolitan Railway Co 1877.

References

See also
Stare decisis

Latin legal terminology